USS LST-277 was a  in the United States Navy during World War II. She was later sold to Chile as Commandante Toro (LST-97).

 Construction and career 
LST-277 was laid down on 31 May 1943 at American Bridge Co., Seneca, Indiana. Launched on 5 September 1943 and commissioned on 24 October 1943.

 Service in the United States 
During World War II, LST-277 was assigned to the Asiatic-Pacific theater. She took part in the Occupation of Kwajalein and Majuro Atolls from 1 to 5 February 1944 and Battle of Saipan from 17 to 24 June 1944. She was also present during the Leyte landings on 20 October 1944.

the ship participate in the Nasugbu landing on 31 January 1945 and the Battle of Okinawa from 25 March to 24 June 1945.

LST-277 was decommissioned on 12 February 1946.

On 20 May 1949, the ship was assigned to Commander Naval Forces Far East (COMNAVFE) Shipping Control Authority for Japan (SCAJAP) and renamed Q055.

Military Sea Transportation Service acquired the ship on 31 March 1952 and renamed T-LST-277.

She was decommissioned again and struck from the Navy Register on 1 February 1973.

Service in Chile 
She was transferred to the Chilean Navy and commissioned on 2 February 1973 with the name Commandante Toro (LST-97).

The ship was out of service in 1977 and sold for scrap later in December.

Awards 
LST-277 have earned the following awards:

American Campaign Medal
Asiatic-Pacific Campaign Medal (5 battle stars)
World War II Victory Medal
Navy Occupation Service Medal (with Asia clasp) 
Philippines Presidential Unit Citation 
Philippines Liberation Medal (1 award)

Citations

Sources 
 
 
 
 

World War II amphibious warfare vessels of the United States
Ships built in Ambridge, Pennsylvania
1943 ships
LST-1-class tank landing ships of the United States Navy